Juvenile may refer to:

 Juvenile (organism)
 Minor (law)
 Children's literature
 Children's clothing
 Juvenile (rapper) (born 1977), stage name of American rapper Terius Gray
 Juveniles, a 2020 studio album by the band Kingswood